Ospedale Luigi Sacco is a hospital in the quartiere of Vialba in Milan, Italy. It was previously known as "sanatorio di Vialba" (Vialba sanitorium).

External links
Map of Ospedale Luigi Sacco

Hospitals in Milan